Sher Khan was the governor of North Bengal from 1268 to 1272 CE.

History
He was appointed by the Sultan of Delhi Ghiyasuddin Balban to serve as the Governor of Bengal after the death of Tatar Khan. Sher Khan ruled quietly for four years as he received little funds and power from Delhi. Thus, most of the province remained in the hands of the Eastern Ganga dynasty. He was succeeded by Amin Khan Aitigin after his death.

See also
List of rulers of Bengal
History of Bengal
History of India

References

Governors of Bengal
13th-century Indian Muslims
1272 deaths
Year of birth unknown
Turkic rulers